Tomorrow We Live, also known as The Man with a Conscience in the United Kingdom, is a 1942 American film directed by Edgar G. Ulmer.

Plot 
Julie Bronson's father is an owner of a cafe in the desert. It unintentionally attracts the attention of criminal Alexander Martin, who operates a nightclub nearby. He chanted Julie's father because he knows he's an escaped prisoner. When a rival gang strikes Martin's nightclub short and small, he gets responsible for Julie's father. He shot him before the eyes of Julie.

Cast 
Ricardo Cortez as The Ghost, Alexander Caesar Martin
Jean Parker as Julie Bronson
Emmett Lynn as William "Pop" Bronson
William Marshall as Lt. Bob Lord
Rose Anne Stevens as Melba
Ray Miller as Chick
Frank Hagney as Kohler
Rex Lease as Shorty
Jack Ingram as Steve
Barbara Slater as The Blonde
Jane Hale as The Dancer

Soundtrack 
 "Juke Box Gal" (Written by Leo Erdody)
 "Senorita Chula" (Written by Ann Levitt and Leo Erdody)

External links 

1942 films
1942 adventure films
1942 crime drama films
Producers Releasing Corporation films
American black-and-white films
Films directed by Edgar G. Ulmer
American crime drama films
American adventure films
1940s English-language films
1940s American films